The Franz Building is an historic building in Portland, Oregon's Yamhill Historic District. The structure was completed in 1878.

External links
 
 Franz Building at Emporis

1878 establishments in Oregon
Buildings and structures completed in 1878
Buildings and structures in Portland, Oregon
Southwest Portland, Oregon